The working time regulations 69 (SI 1998/1833) is a statutory instrument in UK labour law which implements the EU Working Time Directive 2003. It does not extend to Northern Ireland.

Contents
The Working Time Regulations create a basic set of rights for the time people work, particularly 28 days paid holidays, a right to 20 minute paid breaks for each 6 hours worked, a right to weekly rest of at least one full 24 hour period, and the right to limit the working week to 48 hours. These are designed to be minimum standards, which anybody's individual contract or collective agreement through a trade union may improve upon. The Regulations apply to all workers (not just employees) and stipulate minimum rest breaks, daily rest, weekly rest and the maximum average working week.

Paid holidays
Regulations 13 and 13A create a right to paid annual leave of 28 days, expressed as "four weeks" and an additional "1.6 weeks" (including bank holidays and public holidays). In the Working Time Directive article 7 refers to paid annual leave of "at least four weeks", but does not directly define a "week", and nor do the regulations. Article 5 states that the "weekly rest period" means a "seven-day period". When the Directive was implemented in the UK, regulation 13 originally stated "four weeks" but many employers only gave their workers four five-day periods of leave (i.e. 20 days). In response the UK government amended the regulations in 2007 to add the further 1.6 week period, bringing the minimum in line with the European Union requirement for four full weeks (i.e. 28 days). However, this confusion led to the argument that the UK had gone beyond the minimum standards required by the Working Time Directive 2003, even though no country in the EU has a right to fewer holidays than 28 days.

Rest periods
Regulation 10 creates the right to a minimum period of rest of 20 minutes in any shift lasting over 6 hours.
Under 18's are entitled to a 30 minute break for every 4.5 hours worked.

Weekly working time
Regulations 4-5 set a default rule that workers may work no more than 48 hours per week (although one may opt out of it).

ECJ case law has confirmed that statutory holiday will continue to accrue during career breaks or sabbaticals.

Case law

UK v Council (Working Time Directive) [1996] ECR I-5755
Sindicato de Médicos de Asistencia Pública v Conselleria de Sanidad y Consumo de la Generalidad Valenciana [2000] ECR I-7963
R v DTI ex parte BECTU [2001] 3 CMLR 7
Blackburn v Gridquest Limited [2002] IRLR 604
Landeshauptstadt Kiel v Jaegar [2003] ECR I-08389
MacCartney v Oversley House Management [2006] IRLR 514
Lyons v Mitie Security Ltd [2010] IRLR 288, EAT decides a worker who does not give notice to take holidays may lose their paid annual leave entitlement (questionable compatibility with the WTD 2003).

See also

Tax credit
Child tax credit
Working tax credit
Wage regulation

Notes

References
E McGaughey, A Casebook on Labour Law (Hart 2019) ch 7(1)(a)

External links
Direct.gov.uk guidance for workers
Businesslink.gov.uk guidance for businesses
Directive 2003/88/EC of the European Parliament and of the Council of 4 November 2003 concerning certain aspects of the organisation of working time
Old EU Working Time Directive 93/104/EC

United Kingdom labour law
Statutory Instruments of the United Kingdom
1998 in British law
1998 in labor relations